The stylohyoid ligament is a ligament that connects the hyoid bone to the temporal styloid process (of the temporal bone of the skull).

Structure 
The stylohyoid ligament connects the lesser horn of hyoid bone to the styloid process of the temporal bone of the skull.

Clinical significance 
The stylohyoid ligament frequently contains a little cartilage in its center, which is sometimes partially ossified in Eagle syndrome.

Other animals 
In many animals, the epihyal is a distinct bone in the centre of the stylohyoid ligament, which is similar to that seen in Eagle syndrome.

References

Additional images

External links
 Diagram at occup-med.com
 

 Human head and neck
Ligaments